Pakman is a surname. Notable people with the surname include:

 David Pakman (born 1984), Argentinian-American host, political commentator, and YouTube personality
 David B. Pakman (born 1969), internet entrepreneur and venture capitalist

See also
 Akman
 Pac-Man (disambiguation)